Menola is an unincorporated community in Hertford County, North Carolina, United States.

References

Unincorporated communities in Hertford County, North Carolina
Unincorporated communities in North Carolina